XHGT-FM is a radio station on 94.1 FM in Zamora, Michoacán. It is owned by Grupo Radio Zamora and is known as Candela.

History
XEGT-AM received its concession on January 26, 1956. It was owned by Fernando Jiménez Torres until 1964 and broadcast with 1,000 watts on 1490 kHz. In the early 2000s, power was raised to 5 kW day.

XEGT received approval to migrate to FM in 2011.

References

Radio stations in Michoacán